Mōtītī Island is an island in the Bay of Plenty, off the coast of New Zealand's North Island. There were 18 homes occupied by 27 people on the island in the 2006 census.

Geography

The principal activity on the island is agriculture, with a developing avocado plantation. Most residents and visitors travel to the island by air.

There is no public infrastructure (e.g. no public wharf) and the whole island is in private ownership. Access is difficult and expensive. Bay of Plenty Regional Council has regional council responsibility for Mōtītī Island. No territorial authority council is responsible for it – therefore residents pay no rates and there are no council services. Day-to-day administration is by the Department of Internal Affairs.

History and culture

Pre-colonial history
On 2 November 1769, during his first voyage, Captain Cook sailed close inshore to Mōtītī Island, where he reported the most extensive complex of fortified villages he had yet seen. In his journal he refers to it as the "Flat Island".

Recent history
On 5 October 2011 the container ship MV Rena ran aground on Astrolabe Reef, seven kilometers north of Mōtītī Island. Oil from the resulting spill, as well as shipping containers and their contents, reached the shore of the island. In October 2013, Mōtītī Island residents rejected an offer by the MV Rena's owners to start a development project for the island, in return for being able to leave the Rena wreckage where it lay. The plan included:

 Building a landing point for barges
 Creating a one-lane, all-weather road to the airstrip
 Installing a new cellphone tower to improve communications
 Running an underground cable from the mainland to improve power supply
 Putting a permanent beacon on Astrolabe Reef
 Building a Rena memorial from the ship's anchor

On 9 October 2011, the 45-foot launch M/V Excalibur ran aground on Mōtītī Island in bad weather. The crew of six was rescued, but the boat was considered a total loss.

Marae

The island has two marae, belonging to the Ngāti Awa hapū of Te Patuwai and Ngati Maumoana: Te Hinga o te Ra or Te Karioi Marae and Te Hinga o te Ra meeting house; and Te Rua Kopiha Marae and Tamatea ki te Huatahi meeting house.

In October 2020, the Government committed $4,871,246 from the Provincial Growth Fund to upgrade a group of 12 marae, including Te Rua Kopiha Marae. The funding was expected to create 23 jobs.

Aerodrome
Sunair operates from Motiti Island to Tauranga with Cessna 172 aircraft.

See also 

 List of islands of New Zealand

References

Islands of the Bay of Plenty Region